Thirumagal is a 1971 Indian Tamil-language drama film, directed by A. S. A. Sami and produced by C. K. Govindarajalu. The screenplay was written by C. K. Govindarajalu from a story by Aaroor Dass. Music was by K. V. Mahadevan. It stars Lakshmi and  Sivakumar in a major role, with Gemini Ganesan, A. V. M. Rajan, Padmini and Major Sundarrajan playing pivotal roles.

Plot

Cast 
 Gemini Ganesan as Advocate Kandasamy
 Padmini as Kalyani, Kandasamy's wife
 A. V. M. Rajan as Raju, Ranga Rajan's son
 Lakshmi as Radha, Kandhasamy's sister
 Sivakumar as Ramu, Raju's half-brother
 Major Sundarrajan as Rangarajan
 S. Varalakshmi as Maragatham, Ramu's mother
 Nagesh as Subbusamy
 M. Bhanumathi as Bhanu, Subbusamy's fiancé
 Baby Rani as Neela, Kandasamy & Kalyani's daughter
 Udayappa as Bhanu's father
 Jayakumari as club dancer

Soundtrack 
Music was by K. V. Mahadevan.

References

External links 
 

1971 films
Indian drama films
Films scored by K. V. Mahadevan
1970s Tamil-language films
1971 drama films